Samaritan is a 2022 American superhero film directed by Julius Avery and written by Bragi F. Schut. Described as a dark, new take on superhero movies, the story was previously adapted into the Mythos Comics graphic novels by Schut, Marc Olivent, and Renzo Podesta. It is a co-production of Metro-Goldwyn-Mayer and Balboa Productions. The film stars Sylvester Stallone in the main role, Javon "Wanna" Walton, Pilou Asbæk, Dascha Polanco, and Moisés Arias. The story follows a kid who suspects that his neighbor is secretly a superhero who was believed to have died many years prior.

Samaritan was released on August 26, 2022, by United Artists Releasing and Amazon Studios via streaming on Prime Video. The film received mixed reviews from critics.

Plot

Superhumans Samaritan and Nemesis were antagonistic twin brothers who lived in Granite City.  Evenly matched, the villainous Nemesis crafts  a mystical sledgehammer that gave him an edge over the heroic Samaritan. However, the hammer could hurt both brothers. During a confrontation at the city's power plant, both were apparently killed as the plant exploded.  Many people remain fans of Samaritan, and there are constant rumors that he is still alive.

Twenty five years later, thirteen-year-old Sam Cleary tries his best to help his mother with their financial crisis, and, after being threatened with eviction, he accepts a job from a gang headed by Reza. The plan goes awry and Reza tries to blame Sam, but the real gang leader, Cyrus, is impressed and personally gives Sam $110. Reza and his friends later attack Sam as payback but are stopped by Joe Smith, a garbage collector who lives in an apartment across from Sam's.  Joe displays super-strength in fighting off the gang members, and Sam suspects that he is Samaritan. Meanwhile, Cyrus locates Nemesis' hammer at a police station and sets himself up as the new Nemesis, sparking riots and chaos throughout the city, using EMP grenades to blackout and disrupt the city infrastructure.

After Sam confronts him, Joe denies that he is Samaritan, but Reza - still looking for revenge - hits him with his car. Joe is badly injured but heals before Sam's eyes, overheating so much he has to be cooled down in a cold shower and by eating ice cream. Joe and Sam build a friendship, while at the same time Cyrus invites Sam to work with his gang. However, Sam is disturbed when he witnesses their violent activities.

When Joe saves a young girl from an explosion caused by the gang, the media claims that Samaritan is back threatening Cyrus' plans. Reza recognizes Joe as being the same person he "killed" with his car and thus his identity and connection to Sam. Finding Joe's apartment empty, they kidnap Sam and his mother to lure Joe to their headquarters as a trap. Joe breaks into the headquarters, and decimates the gang before being confronted by Cyrus, now dressed as Nemesis and wielding the hammer.  Despite his strength, Joe is weakened from the gang fight, and at a disadvantage against the hammer giving Cyrus the upper hand. As they fight, with Cyrus calling himself Nemesis, and Joe "the good guy", Joe reveals that Samaritan did die during the power plant fire, and Joe is actually Nemesis, who survived but left his villainous life behind. It is shown in flashback that Samaritan had effectively won the fight, but refused to kill Nemesis, instead tossing the hammer away. The roof subsequently gave way, leaving Samaritan hanging precariously above the flames. Despite his best efforts and a change of heart, Nemesis was unable to save his brother. Destroying the hammer, Joe kills Cyrus by knocking him into a burning abyss - the same way Samaritan died - but almost overheats from his healing abilities and the spreading fire. Sam breaks open a pipe to shower him with water, allowing Joe to recover enough to escape with Sam by jumping out a window. When Sam questions Joe about being Nemesis, he says that he is. He tried to save his brother and has been racked with guilt for his atrocities. That the death of Samaritan was his fault, and he couldn't move past it. He tells Sam that there is good and evil in all people, and that Sam has to make the right decisions. Joe leaves, overhearing Sam tell the press that "Samaritan" saved him.

Cast

Production

In February 2019, it was announced that MGM had acquired a spec script by Bragi F. Schut titled Samaritan to be co-produced with Balboa Productions. Schut had written the screenplay prior to adapting the story in a series of graphic novels published by Mythos Comics. In September 2019, Julius Avery joined the production as director.

In February 2019, it was announced that Sylvester Stallone would star in the titular role and also act as producer. In February 2020, Martin Starr, Moisés Arias, Dascha Polanco, Pilou Asbæk, Javon 'Wanna' Walton, Jared Odrick, and Michael Aaron Milligan joined the cast in supporting roles. In March 2020, Natacha Karam joined the cast of the film.

In September 2019, filming was scheduled for a 2020 start date in Atlanta. Filming was confirmed to have commenced by February 26, 2020. On March 14, the production went on hiatus due to the COVID-19 pandemic. By October 8, 2020, filming had resumed.

Jed Kurzel and Kevin Kiner composed the film score, with former previously collaborating with Avery on Overlord (2018). Lakeshore Records released the soundtrack.

Release

Streaming
The release of Samaritan was delayed several times, having previously scheduled to be released theatrically on November 20, 2020, December 11, 2020, and June 4, 2021. The film was released on August 26, 2022, in the United States by United Artists Releasing and Amazon Studios, the latter having purchased MGM that same year, via streaming on Prime Video.

Home media 
It was released on DVD, Blu-ray and 4K Ultra HD Blu-ray on January 3, 2023 by MGM Home Entertainment; (through Universal Pictures Home Entertainment).

Reception

Notes

References

External links
 Samaritan on Amazon Prime Video
 

2022 action drama films
2022 science fiction action films
2020s American films
2020s English-language films
2020s science fiction drama films
2020s superhero films
American action drama films
American science fiction action films
American science fiction drama films
American superhero films
Balboa Productions films
Film productions suspended due to the COVID-19 pandemic
Films about terrorism in the United States
Films based on American comics
Films directed by Julius Avery
Films not released in theaters due to the COVID-19 pandemic
Films postponed due to the COVID-19 pandemic
Films scored by Kevin Kiner
Films scored by Jed Kurzel
Films shot in Atlanta
Live-action films based on comics
Metro-Goldwyn-Mayer films